The Seattle Justice Center is a 13-story government office building in Seattle, Washington, United States. It is located at 600 5th Avenue in the city's civic center complex and houses the Municipal Court of Seattle and the headquarters of the Seattle Police Department. The building was completed in 2002 at a cost of approximately $92 million, taking two years to construct. NBBJ was the architect, and Hoffman Construction was the general contractor.

The Municipal Court occupies the lower three floors and floors eight through twelve, while the police department has offices in the rest of the building. It replaced the Public Safety Building, which was demolished in 2005. The facility was built to the city's green design standards, including a green roof, but as of 2010, "struggled to take hold, plagued to different degrees by weeds, a lack of summer irrigation, and the need for repeated replanting". Other environmentally friendly features include a façade providing ventilation to the building, and a water retention system.

The Justice Center is connected to the adjacent City Hall by an underground waterway, which forms an artificial waterfall in the western plaza.

References

2002 establishments in Washington (state)
Buildings and structures completed in 2002
Downtown Seattle
Government buildings in Seattle